The 1999 Milan–San Remo was the 90th edition of the monument classic Milan–San Remo and was won by Andrei Tchmil of .

Results

1999
March 1999 sports events in Europe
1999 in road cycling
1999 in Italian sport
Milan-San Remo